M. A. Hamid is a Jatiya Party (Ershad) politician and the former Member of Parliament of Mymensingh-11.

Career
Hamid was elected to parliament from Mymensingh-11 as a Jatiya Party candidate in 1988.

References

Jatiya Party politicians
Living people
4th Jatiya Sangsad members
People from Mymensingh District
Year of birth missing (living people)